Thomas Rohde (born 19 November 1999) is a Danish professional footballer who plays for VSK Aarhus as a forward.

Youth career
Rohde started playing for Hatting/Torsted, before joining  the talent school of AC Horsens at the age of 12 as a goalkeeper, but was later excluded from the squad for the U13 team. He then moved back to his former club, Hatting/Torsted. As a U15 player, he was spotted by scouts from Vejle Boldklub and moved to the club, where he played one season as a U17 player. During his time at Vejle, he lost the desire to play as a goalkeeper. Rohde then played as a centre back, and after playing for Vejle for half a year, he moved back to Hatting/Torsted, where he started playing as a forward. Rohde decided to give it another chance in AC Horsens. The club held open training sessions and Rohde went to them, before joining the team permanently.

Ahead of the 2019/20 season, Rohde joined Danish 2nd Division club VSK Aarhus.

References

1999 births
Living people
Danish men's footballers
AC Horsens players
Danish Superliga players
Danish 2nd Division players
Association football forwards
VSK Aarhus players
Hatting/Torsted IF players
Vejle Boldklub players